A pull-up is an upper-body strength exercise. The pull-up is a closed-chain movement where the body is suspended by the hands, gripping a bar or other implement at a distance typically wider than shoulder-width, and pulled up. As this happens, the elbows flex and the shoulders adduct and extend to bring the elbows to the torso. 

Pull-ups build up several muscles of the upper body, including the latissimus dorsi, trapezius, and biceps brachii. A pull-up may be performed with overhand (pronated), underhand (supinated)—sometimes referred to as a chin-up—neutral, or rotating hand position. 

Pull-ups are used by some organizations as a component of fitness tests, and as a conditioning activity for some sports.

Movement
Beginning by hanging from the bar, the body is pulled up vertically. From the top position, the participant lowers their body until the arms and shoulders are fully extended. The end range of motion at the top end may be chin over bar or higher, such as chest to bar.

Pull-ups are a closed-chain, compound movement involving flexion at the elbow and adduction or extension of the shoulder joint. The trapezius, infraspinatus, and brachialis muscles are most active at the beginning of the pull-up; the latissimus dorsi, teres major, and biceps brachii reach peak activity during the middle of the movement, and the triceps brachii and subscapularis experienced maximum activity at the top of the movement. There is similarity to the pull-down in terms of the muscle activation.

A 2017 study found that pronated grip activated the middle trapezius more than the neutral grip, but that overall the muscle activation of different grip variants was similar. Muscle activation is significantly different depending on whether the pull-up is completed individually or in a set without resting between repetitions, which is more efficient due to muscle and tendon strech-shortening rebound.

Overhead movements such as pull-ups reduce the subacromial space and create a risk of shoulder impingement. According to one study, the pronated grip pull-up with hands at shoulder width apart led to less risk of impingement than other variations studied.

Variations

Pull-ups can be done with a supinated, neutral, or pronated grip; devices allow the grip to rotate during the pull-up. The pull-up performed with an supinated grip is sometimes called a chin-up. A pull-up may be completed using different widths of hand position; studies have found that participants freely choose a grip that is between 20 and 50 percent wider than shoulder width. A grip that is too wide could increase the injury risk or reduce the number of repetitions able to be completed due to lengthening the lever arm.

Equipment

Pull-ups are commonly performed using a bar; doorway mounted bars are sold for use in home gyms. They can also be completed by grasping towels, rotating handles or gymnastics rings.

Use

Pull-ups are a common way to measure upper body strength, endurance, and strength-to-weight ratio. The strength to do a pull-up is correlated with job-related tasks in some careers such as firefighting, police, and military.

Pull-ups are used as a conditioning activity for many sports, especially those that require pulling strength, including rock climbing, gymnastics, rope climbing, rowing, and swimming.   They are also used by police and military to increase muscular strength among their members.

Some organizations allow women to use a flexed arm hang as a substitute for a pull up in fitness tests after discovering that few female recruits could complete a pull-up. According to a 2003 study in college-age women, one third of participants were able to complete a pull-up after a twelve-week full-body strength training program.

Guinness World Records
The Guinness World Record for the most consecutive pull-ups was set by Japan Coast Guard diver Kenta Adachi in 2022 with 651 pull-ups, taking 87 minutes.

References

Further reading

Bodyweight exercises
Articles containing video clips